Colin Robert Miller (born October 29, 1992) is a Canadian professional ice hockey defenceman for the Dallas Stars of the National Hockey League (NHL). Miller was selected by the Los Angeles Kings in the fifth round (151st overall) of the 2012 NHL Entry Draft.

Playing career
Miller played three seasons (2010–2013) of major junior hockey with the Sault Ste. Marie Greyhounds of the Ontario Hockey League (OHL), scoring 31 goals and 74 assists for 105 points, while earning 201 penalty minutes, in 174 games played. At the conclusion of the 2012–13 OHL season he was selected to receive the Mickey Renaud Captain's Trophy as the OHL team captain that best exemplifies leadership on and off the ice.

On July 29, 2013, the Los Angeles Kings of the National Hockey League (NHL) signed Miller to a three-year, entry-level contract.

During the 2014–15 season, on January 25, 2015, at the AHL All-Star Skills Competition in Utica, New York, Miller won the fastest skater competition, then proceeded to set the AHL record for hardest shot, clocking at 105.5 miles per hour. On June 26, Miller was traded by the Kings along with Martin Jones and the 13th overall selection (Jakub Zbořil) in the 2015 NHL Entry Draft to the Boston Bruins in exchange for Milan Lucic. After playing one season in the Bruins' organization, he signed a two-year contract extension worth $2 million.

Having been exposed by the Bruins at the 2017 NHL Expansion Draft, Miller was selected by the Vegas Golden Knights on June 21, 2017.

On May 28, 2018, Miller scored the first ever Stanley Cup Finals goal in the Vegas Golden Knights' history during the first period of Game 1 of the 2018 Stanley Cup Finals. During Game 4 of the Stanley Cup Finals, Miller was hit in the face by T. J. Oshie subsequently breaking his nose. The Washington Capitals ended up winning the Stanley Cup the following game. Miller ended both the regular and postseason setting career highs in goals, assists, and points.

On June 28, 2019, the Vegas Golden Knights traded Miller to the Buffalo Sabres in exchange for a 2021 second-round pick and a 2022 fifth-round pick.

On July 13, 2022, the Dallas Stars signed Miller as a free agent from the Sabres on a two-year, $3.7 million contract.

Career statistics

Regular season and playoffs

International

Awards and honours

References

External links
 

1992 births
Living people
Boston Bruins players
Buffalo Sabres players
Canadian ice hockey defencemen
Dallas Stars players
Ice hockey people from Ontario
Los Angeles Kings draft picks
Manchester Monarchs (AHL) players
Providence Bruins players
Sault Ste. Marie Greyhounds players
Sportspeople from Sault Ste. Marie, Ontario
Vegas Golden Knights players